Derbesia is a genus of green algae in the family Derbesiaceae. The plant was originally known from different names applied to its larger sporophyte, Derbesia, and its less conspicuous gametophyte, Halicystis.  Derbesia was successfully cultured in the laboratories of German phycologist Peter Kornmann to learn that both it and the plant Halicystis were different parts of the life cycle of the same organism.

The genus name of Derbesia is in honour of Auguste Alphonse Derbès (1818-1894), French naturalist, zoologist and botanist,
Professor of Natural Sciences at the University of Aix-Marseille.

List of species
 Derbesia attenuata
 Derbesia boergesenii
 Derbesia corallicola
 Derbesia fastigiata
 Derbesia furcata
 Derbesia hollenbergii
 Derbesia indica
 Derbesia longifructa
 Derbesia marina
 Derbesia minima
 Derbesia novae-zelandiae
 Derbesia osterhoutii
 Derbesia pacifica
 Derbesia padinae
 Derbesia prolifica
 Derbesia rhizophora
 Derbesia sirenarum
 Derbesia tenuissima
 Derbesia turbinata
 Derbesia vaucheriaeformis

References

External links

Ulvophyceae genera
Bryopsidales